The primus pilus or primipilus was the senior centurion of the first cohort in a Roman legion,  a formation of five double-strength centuries of 160 men, was called the primus pilus; he was a career soldier and advisor to the legate. The Primus Pilus would remain in command for one year. They could continue to serve in the army after their term ended if there was a vacancy in command or if they wished to become an independent commander of an auxilia unit or the praefectus castrorum.

During the Roman Empire, emperor Claudius created the office of primus pilus iterum. To become the primus pilus iterum an officer must have formerly served as a tribune in the vigiles, cohortes urbanae, or Praetorian Guard. The primus pilus iterum would hold the responsibility of a Praefectus castrorum but with higher pay.

The primus pilus was a well paid position. They could accumulate enough wealth to become part of the equestrian class. Even if they failed to gather such wealth, they were promoted to the equestrian class after retiring.

Only eight officers in a fully officered legion outranked the primus pilus: The legate (lēgātus legiōnis), commanding the legion; the senior tribune (tribunus laticlavius); the Camp Prefect (praefectus castrorum); and the five junior tribunes (tribuni angusticlavii).

The primus pilus centurion had a place in the war councils along with the military tribunes and the Legate.

References

Ancient Roman titles
Military ranks of ancient Rome